The Minister of State at the Department of Defence is a junior ministerial post in the Department of Defence of the Government of Ireland who performs duties and functions delegated by the Minister for Defence. Although the position has often been held jointly with that of the post of Minister of State at the Department of the Taoiseach with responsibility as Government Chief Whip, which entitles the office-holder to regularly attend meetings of cabinet, the position of Minister of State does not itself hold cabinet rank. The title was first used on 1 January 1978, replacing the position of Parliamentary Secretary to the Minister of Defence. The Minister of State at the Department of Defence is a member of the Council of Defence.

The current Minister of State is Peter Burke, TD, who was appointed in December 2022. Burke is also Minister of State for European Affairs.

List of Parliamentary Secretaries to the Minister for Defence 1924–1978

List of Ministers of State at the Department of Defence 1978–present

References

Defence
Department of Defence (Ireland)